Julian Gardiner Smith (born 25 August 1967) is a Bahamian soccer defender.

International career
He made his international debut for Bahamas in a March 2000 FIFA World Cup qualification match against Anguilla and has earned a total of 6 caps, scoring no goals. He has represented his country in 5 FIFA World Cup qualification matches.

He also plays for the national beach soccer team.

References

External links

1967 births
Living people
Place of birth missing (living people)
Association football defenders
Bahamian footballers
Bahamas international footballers